Katherine Gibbs, Katharine Gibbs, Katie Gibbs, or Katy Gibbs may refer to:

 Katie Gibbs, Canadian politician
 Katharine Gibbs, founder of Gibbs College
 Kay Francis, actress